Karjalan Sanomat (Karelian News) is a Finnish language newspaper from the Republic of Karelia, published in Petrozavodsk.

Previous names:
 1920-1923: Karjalan kommuuni (Karelian Commune)
 1923-1937: Punainen Karjala (Red Karelia)
 1938-1940: Советской Карелия (Soviet Karelia)
 1940-1955: Totuus (Truth)
 1955-1957: Leninilainen totuus (Lenin's Truth)
 1957-1991: Neuvosto-Karjala (Soviet Karelia)
 1991-: Karjalan sanomat (Karelian News)

From 1938 to 1940 the newspaper was printed in Karelian using Cyrillic, rather than Finnish.

See also
Eastern Bloc information dissemination

References

Newspapers established in 1920
Finnish-language newspapers
Newspapers published in Russia
Newspapers published in the Soviet Union
Eastern Bloc mass media